ADBA may refer to:

Anaerobic Digestion and Biogas Association
American Dog Breeders Association
Australian Defence Basketball Association
'Allelujah! Don't Bend! Ascend!, an album by Godspeed You! Black Emperor, released in 2012